This article lists all rugby league footballers who have represented the NRL All Stars/World All Stars in the annual All Stars Match against the Indigenous All Stars. Players are listed according to the date of their debut game.

List of players

1 – Tony Williams was capped despite never playing a game for the NRL All Stars.
2 – In 2016, the NRL All Stars team changed to the World All Stars.

See also

List of Indigenous All Stars players

References

 
N
NRL All Stars match